Persecution Mania is the second studio album by German thrash metal band Sodom, released on 1 December 1987 by Steamhammer/SPV. The album, while still heavily rooted in Black metal style, marked a beginning of a change of sound from black metal to thrash metal. As well as defining Sodom's sound, it exemplified the thrash metal genre at a time when it arguably peaked in popularity. The album also bore similarity to the music of other German bands such as Destruction and Kreator, and the term "Teutonic" thrash was coined from this.

Despite what the cover may imply, the lyrical themes of the album are centred more around politics and war than religion. This is largely due to guitarist Frank "Blackfire" Gosdzik joining the band. He brought new songwriting aspects to the band that gave it a much more organized and clearer sound, as well as helping Sodom to carve a lyrical niche that it still practices to this day. The outro guitar lead in track 9, "Bombenhagel", is the German national anthem, "Das Lied der Deutschen".

Persecution Mania was re-released in 2000 as part of a double pack with the Obsessed by Cruelty/In the Sign of Evil split. Both CD releases include the Expurse of Sodomy EP.

Track listing

The European CD release has a rerecording of "Outbreak of Evil" and the Expurse of Sodomy EP as bonus tracks. The cassette has only the re-recorded "Outbreak of Evil" as a bonus track.

Personnel
Sodom
 Tom Angelripper  - vocals, bass
 Frank Blackfire - guitars
 Chris Witchhunter- drums

Additional musician
 Harris Johns - guitar solo on "Bombenhagel"

Production
Johannes Beck - cover painting
Harris Johns - engineering, producer

References

Sodom (band) albums
1987 albums
SPV/Steamhammer albums
Albums produced by Harris Johns